Hashim is a common male Arabic given name.

Hashim may also refer to:
Hashim ibn Abd Manaf
Hashim Amir Ali
Hashim (poet)
Hashim Amla
Hashim Thaçi
Hashim Khan
Hashim Qureshi
Mir Hashim Ali Khan
Hashim al-Atassi
Hashim ibn Utbah
People using it in their patronymic include:
Asad ibn Hashim
Sulaiman bin Hashim
Musicians:
Hashim (Jerry Calliste, Jr.)
 
Others:
Banu Hashim

See also
Hashem

Arabic masculine given names
Bosniak masculine given names